Jovan Daniél van Vuuren (born 17 July 1996) is a South African athlete who competes as a long jumper.

A native of Bloemfontein, van Vuuren was a bronze medalist in long jump at the 2022 Commonwealth Games in Birmingham, England. It was a breakthrough year for van Vuuren as he also jumped a career best 8.16 metres that season, won his first national long jump title and appeared at the World Championships.

References

External links
Jovan van Vuuren at World Athletics

1996 births
Living people
South African male long jumpers
Commonwealth Games bronze medallists for South Africa
Commonwealth Games medallists in athletics
Medallists at the 2022 Commonwealth Games
Athletes (track and field) at the 2022 Commonwealth Games
World Athletics Championships athletes for South Africa
Competitors at the 2019 Summer Universiade
Sportspeople from Bloemfontein